Midrash Shmuel is a Haredi yeshiva catering to English-speaking students, located in the Sha'arei Hesed neighborhood in West Jerusalem. It was founded in 1993 by Rabbi Binyomin Moskovits who functions as its Rosh HaYeshiva (dean), and was named after his mentor, the late Rabbi Shmuel Rozovsky.

Educational goals
The yeshiva is designed for English-speaking post-high-school students from both inside and outside Israel. Midrash Shmuel also has an introductory program called Aliyos Shmuel for college graduates and older students who seek to learn at a beginner's level, and a kollel (post-graduate) program which enrolls approximately 90 married students. All classes are held in English.

History
Midrash Shmuel is part of the widespread trend since the 1970s of yeshiva Torah study programs in Israel for post-high-school students from America and other English-speaking countries. In the 1970s there were only a handful of such programs for overseas students at the Mir, Brisk yeshiva, and Ponovezh yeshiva. Today, there are dozens of such yeshivas.

Rabbi Moskovits opened Midrash Shmuel in the early 1990s at the urging of his students and with the heartfelt encouragement of Torah giants of the generation, Rabbi Shlomo Zalman Auerbach and Rabbi Elazar Menachem Mann Shach, among others.

Educational activities
Midrash Shmuel recruits students from America, United Kingdom and France who have completed yeshiva highschools and its dean is active in this regard.

Students in the rabbinic ordination program receive semikhah directly from the rosh yeshiva Rabbi Moskovits. Students develop personal relationships with the rosh yeshiva and rabbinic lecturers which continue after graduation, as alumni participate in reunions and yeshiva fund-raising events in communities where they settle.

Curriculum
Rabbi Moskovits' gemara lectures are heavily influenced by Rabbi Shmuel Rozovsky, while his ethical lectures are influenced by Rabbi Yechezkel Levenstein. Moskovits emphasizes a strong textual reading of relevant sources. Every student in the yeshiva delivers, at a minimum, two chaburos ("informal lectures") per month.

Guest speakers
The yeshiva also invites noted rabbis from the international English-speaking Torah world to address the yeshiva. In past years, these have included Rabbi Avraham Chaim Feuer, formerly of Kehillas Beis Avrohom in Monsey, New York; Rabbi Harvey Belovski, rabbi at Dunstan Road Synagogue in England, and Rabbi Aharon Kaufman, rosh yeshiva of the Yeshiva Gedolah of Waterbury, Connecticut Rabbi Dovid Orlofsky Neve Yerushalayim.

Summer programs
Midrash Shmuel runs summer programs for high school students from England, Canada, the United States, and South Africa. The programs combine in-depth gemara learning and halakha, mussar, and hashkafah (Jewish philosophy) shiurim with recreational outings and activities.

College accreditation
College credits are offered through Touro College and Hebrew Theological College.

Women's program
In August 2010, actress and dancer Rachel Factor, whose husband studies at the Midrash Shmuel kollel, opened Midreshes Shmuel, a post-high school women's Torah learning and performing arts program, under the direction of Moskovits. However, this branch of the school closed in 2012.

Notable alumni
Notable graduates of Midrash Shmuel include:
 Rabbi Josh Bennett, Rabbinical Coordinator at the London Beth Din 
 Rabbi Stephen Berger, Director of the NCSY Northwest Region, Vancouver, British Columbia
 Rabbi Hershel Brand, teacher at Yeshivat Ner Yaakov, Jerusalem, and author of On Eagles Wings: Moshiach, Redemption and the World to Come (Targum Press, 2002)
 Rabbi Yonoson Hughes, Rabbi of Richmond Synagogue, London and author of Understanding Reb Chaim: Reb Chaim Soloveitchik zt"l of Brisk (2010)
 Rabbi Scott Kahn, Rosh Yeshiva, Yeshivat Yesodei HaTorah, Moshav Zanoah, Israel 
Rabbi Natan Slifkin, the "Zoo Rabbi", author of one dozen books on Torah and science. Slifkin's first book, Lying for Truth: Understanding Ya'akov's Deception of Yitzchak, was initially published by the yeshiva with an approbation by Rabbi Moskovits.
 Rabbi Yisrael Shaw, Torah educator at Machon Yaakov, Har Nof, and editor-in-chief of the Daf Yomi publications of Kollel Iyun Hadaf
 Rabbi Jonathan Shooter, author of The Haftara Handbook: Lessons from the Prophets for the Contemporary Jew (Devora Publishing, 2010);
 Rabbi Mutti Balla, Chief Rabbi of the German Army 
R’ Peretz Traube, famous WhatsApp influencer.
Rabbi Avrohom Zeidman, assistant rabbi of the Seed Programme in Edgware, London
 Rabbi Daniel Salter, Rebbi at Menorah Boys High School in Edmonton, Canada

References

External links
Home page
Chanukah lighting Medrash Shmuel (video)
Purim party in yeshiva Midrash Shmuel part 3 (video)

Orthodox yeshivas in Jerusalem
Educational institutions established in 1993
1993 establishments in Israel